Mehron is a village in northwestern Tajikistan. It is the seat of the Kuhistoni Mastchoh District, which is located in the Sughd Region.

References 

Populated places in Sughd Region